was a Japanese Rear-Admiral.  He commanded the Destroyer Ariake and participated Battle of Tsushima during the Russo-Japanese War.

Biography
Kutsumi was born on December 22, 1866, at Maniwa, Katsuyama Domain. He graduated from the Imperial Japanese Naval Academy as part of its 15th class and served on the Kongō as an ensign. In April 1894, he was a navigator at the Chōkai and participated in the First Sino-Japanese War. Afterwards, he served at the Sasebo Naval District and as the captain of the Yoshino and the Akebono. During the Russo-Japanese War, he participated at the Battle of Tsushima as part of the 1st Fleet while commanding the Ariake. He was promoted to captain and given command of the Corvette Katsuragi in 1910. He was promoted to Rear-Admiral in December 1918 before retiring on 1927.

Court Titles
Senior Eighth Rank (December 14, 1891)
Junior Seventh Rank (March 8, 1898)

References

Bibliography
Toyama, Misao, Army and Navy General Personnel Overview, Navy Edition, Fuyo Shobo Publishing Co., Ltd., 1981.
Fukukawa, Hideki Japanese Navy General Dictionary, Fuyo Shobo Publishing Co., Ltd., 2000.
History of the Japanese Navy edited by the Navy History Preservation Society, Volume 10, released: Daiichi Hoki Shuppan, 1995.

1866 births
1943 deaths
People from Okayama Prefecture
People of Meiji-period Japan
Imperial Japanese Navy admirals
Japanese military personnel of the First Sino-Japanese War
Japanese military personnel of the Russo-Japanese War
Imperial Japanese Naval Academy alumni